The Lockdown Sessions is the 32nd studio album by English musician Elton John, released through EMI in the United Kingdom and Interscope Records in the United States on 22 October 2021. A collaborative album, it was recorded during the COVID-19 pandemic, after John was forced to pause his Farewell Yellow Brick Road tour due to lockdown. The album includes three singles: "Cold Heart (Pnau remix)" with Dua Lipa, "After All" with Charlie Puth, and "Finish Line" with Stevie Wonder. A 2022 reissue of the album included "Merry Christmas" with Ed Sheeran and "Hold Me Closer" with Britney Spears.

Background
The album features several previously released tracks: "Learn to Fly", released in June 2020; "Chosen Family", John's duet with Rina Sawayama on her Sawayama album; the Gorillaz' track "The Pink Phantom" from their 2020 album Song Machine, Season One: Strange Timez, on which John appears as a guest alongside 6lack; John's cover of the Pet Shop Boys' "It's a Sin" along with Years & Years, released in May 2021; Miley Cyrus' version of "Nothing Else Matters" featuring John alongside various other guests, released in June 2021 from the Metallica tribute album The Metallica Blacklist; and John's collaboration with Lil Nas X "One of Me", from Lil Nas X's debut studio album Montero.

Besides these, the record also features collaborations with other artists including Pearl Jam frontman Eddie Vedder, Brandi Carlile, Charlie Puth, Stevie Wonder, Nicki Minaj, Young Thug, Stevie Nicks, and Glen Campbell.

John explained the project in a statement: "Some of the recording sessions had to be done remotely, via Zoom, which I'd obviously never done before. Some of the sessions were recorded under very stringent safety regulations: working with another artist, but separated by glass screens. But all the tracks I worked on were really interesting and diverse, stuff that was completely different to anything I'm known for, stuff that took me out of my comfort zone into completely new territory. And I realised there was something weirdly familiar about working like this. At the start of my career, in the late 60s, I worked as a session musician. Working with different artists during lockdown reminded me of that. I'd come full circle: I was a session musician again. And it was still a blast."

When the album hit number-one in the UK charts on 29 October 2021, John said "I am so proud of what we have created" and wrote on his social media accounts:

Singles
The lead single, "Cold Heart (Pnau remix)" with Dua Lipa, combines elements of John's 1989 song "Sacrifice", his 1972 single "Rocket Man", his 1976 album track "Where's the Shoorah?" and his 1983 single "Kiss the Bride", and was released on 13 August 2021. On 15 October 2021, the single peaked at number one on the UK Singles Chart. This was John’s first UK number one in 16 years, since 2005's posthumous Tupac Shakur collaboration "Ghetto Gospel".

The album's official second single, "After All", is a collaboration with American singer Charlie Puth. It was released on 22 September 2021.

The album's official third single, "Finish Line", is a collaboration with American singer Stevie Wonder. It was released on 30 September 2021. "Finish Line" failed to chart on the Official UK Top 100, but debuted at number 73 on the Official UK Singles Sales Chart Top 100 on 28 January 2022

Critical reception

The Lockdown Sessions received generally positive reviews from music critics. At Metacritic, which assigns a normalised rating out of 100 to reviews from mainstream critics, the album has an average score of 70 based on ten reviews, indicating "generally favorable reviews". Aggregator AnyDecentMusic?  gave it 6.8 out of 10, based on their assessment of the critical consensus.
Gary Ryan from NME gave it four out of five stars, saying: "All in all, The Lockdown Sessions''' all-bets-off stylistic game of spin-the-bottle feels attuned to 2021's post-genre Spotify world, as Elton continues to further his musical universe".

Commercial performance
The album was released on 22 October 2021, and in the OCC's UK midweek chart update on 25 October, the album was described as being in a "four way battle" with Duran Duran, Lana Del Rey and Biffy Clyro for the number-one position. It later became John's eighth number-one album in the UK on 29 October 2021, his first number-one album since 2012's Good Morning to the Night.The Lockdown Sessions achieved 31,000 chart sales in the UK, 84% of which were physical (CD and vinyl) sales in the first week. It was John's second number one in the UK in less than a month – "Cold Heart (Pnau remix)" with Dua Lipa reached number one on the UK Singles Chart earlier in the month. In the United States, the album debuted at number ten on the Billboard 200'' with first-week sales of 29,000 album-equivalent units, 17,000 of that sum were pure album copies, it went straight to number four on the U.S. Top Album Sales chart.

Track listing

Charts

Weekly charts

Year-end charts

Certifications

Release history

Individual tracks

Learn to Fly
When talking about the collaboration, Elton John tweeted: "When the guys first sent me the song, I just loved it. It was an honour to lend my vocals and some piano." In a statement, Surfaces said: "After a series of Zoom studio sessions, we were able to record together from quarantine. Working with Elton felt like the idea of winning a Grammy. He was so passionate and driven and we couldn’t have wished for a more effortless collaboration."
A music video to accompany the release of "Learn to Fly" was released onto YouTube on June 24, 2020. It was made in collaboration with director and illustrator Ivan Dixon, who also provided the visuals for "Bloom", and was produced by Sean Zwan from Studio Showoff.

References

External links

2021 albums
Elton John albums
EMI Records albums
Interscope Records albums